Arten Gill Viaduct is an eleven-arch railway bridge in Dentdale, Cumbria, England. The viaduct carries the Settle to Carlisle railway line over Artengill Beck. The viaduct was originally designed to be further west, which is lower down the steep valley side, but by moving the line slightly eastwards, the viaduct could be installed at a higher location, thereby using fewer materials in its height. Arten Gill Viaduct is constructed partly from Dent Marble in the inside of the arches instead of the more usual brick. Dent Marble is a type of dark limestone which was quarried from Artengill beneath the viaduct itself. The viaduct is a grade II listed structure, and a scheduled monument.

History
Groundwork on site was started in May 1870, with work on the viaduct itself beginning a year later, on 3 May 1871. The parapets were completed in July 1875, with the date being set into the middle stone on each side of the parapet wall.

Whilst it is largely constructed of sandstone, the inner arches of the viaduct spans (soffit) are made from Dent Marble, as opposed to brick, which was normal practice for viaduct building at that time. Most of the Dent Marble used in the viaduct was sourced from a quarry directly underneath the bridge in Artengill, and at least  of dressed stone was used in its construction. The use of Dent Marble has been attributed to the proximity of the quarry, rather than of the need for that particular type of stone. The size of the stones also often lead to the breakdown of the lifting gear.

The viaduct was constructed by Benton and Woodiwiss as part of Contract No. 2 (Dent Head to Smardale Viaduct, a total of ), and Arten Gill is listed as bridge number 84. Like many of the viaducts along the line, it was designed by John Sydney Crossley. This course, and change of position, also meant that the viaduct bows out slightly eastwards, as it follows the contours of the hill. The viaduct was also constructed with two sets of widened piers in the middle; this was in case of collapse, the widened piers would provide stability, and stop the rest of the viaduct collapsing too. 

As indicated by the name of the viaduct, it crosses a steep valley through which the small watercourse of Artengill passes, but also an old pack-horse route eastwards across the moors. The route between Blea Moor Tunnel and  traverses the western edge of Great Knoutberry Hill and so needed several cuttings. These were prone to collecting snow during heavy winters, and attempts in clearing the snowdrifts involved dispatching the snow over the edge of Arten Gill Viaduct.

Arten Gill is a scheduled monument, and was also grade II listed in October 1999.

Name
Most railway authors and railway mapping list the viaduct as being called Arten Gill. However, the beck it straddles is called Artengill, which persists as a variant spelling for the viaduct. Historic England name the viaduct both as Arten Gill, and Artengill in their heritage listing, as do some writers.

See also
Listed buildings in Dent, Cumbria

Notes

References

Sources

External links

Viaducts on the Settle Carlisle Railway
Arten Gill Viaduct on National Trails

Railway viaducts in Cumbria
Bridges completed in 1875
Grade II listed buildings in Cumbria
Grade II listed bridges
Viaducts in England